Ashkharbek Kalantar (February 11, 1884, in Ardvi, Armenia – June 1942) was an Armenian archaeologist and historian who played an important role in the founding of archaeology in Armenia.

Born into the Armenian noble families of Loris-Melikov and Arghutians (from maternal side), he graduated St. Petersburg University in 1911 under Nicholas Marr. He was appointed a Fellow of the Archaeological Institute, of Imperial Russian Archaeological Society and the keeper of the Asiatic Museum in St. Petersburg. He was one of the founders of Yerevan State University. Ashkharbek Kalantar authored more than 80 scholarly articles.

Early life
Ashkharbek Kalantar was born in Ardvi, Armenia on February 11, 1884. He received his early education at the Nersisian School in Tiflis, graduating from there in 1903. He continued his studies at the St. Petersburg University with Nicholas Marr as his teacher. He terminated his studies in 1911 to become a member of the archaeological society of the University.

Excavations at Ani 
As a student, Kalantar in 1907 participated the archaeological excavations of Nicholas Marr in the Armenian medieval capital Ani. In 1914 he was appointed the head of the XIIIth Ani Archaeological excavation campaign. In 1918 he organized the evacuation of about 6000 items from the Ani Museum, which are currently in History Museum of Armenia in Yerevan. He was the last archaeologist to describe monuments, mostly in Ani region, which did not survive after the 1920s.

In 2013 an international expedition repeated Kalantar's expedition of August–September 1920 to document the current - often desperate - situation of ten or more monuments of Ani region (Alaman, Arjo-Arij, Bagaran, Khtskonk, Mren, etc.).

Ancient irrigation systems and Urartian inscriptions 
In 1910s Kalantar studied the ancient monuments in the Lori and Surmali regions, the basilica in Zor, headed the excavations in medieval monastery Vanstan (Imirzek) in Armenia and revealed its epigraphic materials. In 1917 with Nicholas Adontz he participated the II Van Archaeological expedition and studied the Urartian inscriptions there.

From 1920 to the 1930s he revealed the existence of a pre-Urartian irrigation system on Mt. Aragats and Geghama range in Armenia, discovered vishaps (stone monuments) there, studied their rock-carved figures, and published articles on the Urartian inscriptions found in Armenia.

Founding of the Yerevan State University and of the Commission of Ancient Monuments 

In 1918 and 1919 he lectured in Transcaucasian university in Tiflis, in 1919 he becomes one of seven founding members of the Yerevan State University, the founder of the chair of archaeology and oriental studies.

With architect Alexander Tamanian and painter Martiros Saryan he was one of founders of the Commission of Ancient Monuments in Armenia. During 1920-1938 he organized over 30 expeditions in Armenia.

In 1931 Kalantar directed the excavations in Old Vagharshapat. In 1930s with Alexander Tamanian acted to save the two basilica churches, Katoghike and Poghos-Petros in Yerevan (both were finally destroyed by the ruling regime).

In 1935 Kalantar was appointed as the member of the Council of Armenian branch of Soviet Academy of Sciences.

Publications 
Ashkharbek Kalantar authored over 80 articles. The English translations of his selected works were published in 3 volumes in 1994, 1999, 2004 by Recherches et Publications,  Paris-Neuchâtel, and in Armenian in Yerevan, 2007.

American Journal of Archaeology (AJA 100, 638, 1996) reviewing Kalantar's volume writes:
"While Lehmann-Haupt and Marr are often credited with sparking investigations into the history and prehistory of  eastern Anatolia and
southern Transcaucasia, this compilation* of selected writings and photographs of Ashkharbek Kalantar (1884-1942) makes a persuasive case that it was he who most thoroughly shaped archaeology in the Armenian highlands."

"Kalantar's life and work provide a testimony to the enduring importance of the Armenian highlands to world history and prehistory..."

Great Purge victim 
On 19 March 1938 Kalantar was arrested in Yerevan by the Stalinist regime, among other professors, as an ‘enemy of the nation’; the precise date and place of his death in Russia are unknown.

Legacy 

A bust of Ashkharbek Kalantar was unveiled in February 2015 in the entrance hall of Yerevan State University.

Edik Minasyan, Dean of the Faculty of History at Yerevan State University, said of Kalantar:

Later publications 
 Ashkharbek Kalantar, Armenia: From the Stone Age to  the Middle Ages,  Civilisations du Proche Orient, Se´rie 1, Vol. 2, Recherches et Publications,  Neuchâtel, Paris, 1994; 
 Ashkharbek Kalantar, The Mediaeval Inscriptions of Vanstan, Armenia,  Civilisations du Proche-Orient: Series 2 - Philologie, Vol. 2, Recherches et Publications,  Neuchâtel, Paris, 1999; 
 Ashkharbek Kalantar, Materials on Armenian and Urartian History (with a contribution by Mirjo Salvini), Civilisations du Proche-Orient: Series 4 - Hors Série, Neuchâtel, Paris, 2004;

From Kalantar's documents

References

Webarchive template wayback links
1884 births
1942 deaths
People from Lori Province
Saint Petersburg State University alumni
Academic staff of Yerevan State University
20th-century Armenian historians
Armenian archaeologists
Archaeologists from the Russian Empire
Soviet archaeologists
Armenian studies scholars
Armenian people from the Russian Empire
Soviet Armenians
Great Purge victims from Armenia